BTN CLS Knights Indonesia is a basketball club based in Surabaya, East Java, Indonesia that plays in the ASEAN Basketball League. Their home games are played at GOR Kertajaya Surabaya.

History

Indonesian Basketball League (IBL)

First years (2003–2011) 
CLS Knights first competed in the Indonesian Basketball League in 2003. They never won an IBL title from their inaugural season until 2010 when the league changed their name to National Basketball League (NBL). During the league's first season which is the NBL in 2010-11, the Knights reached the league finals for the first time, but losing to the eventual champions, Satria Muda BritAma.

Dimaz Muharri era (2011–2013)
Dimaz is a huge change for the CLS Knights Surabaya. Although he has never won the NBL in his career, Dimaz had garnered individual awards such as being the player with the Top Steal and Assist. The Knights' best finish with Dimaz on their team was 3rd place.

"Big 2 Point Guards" (2013–2015)
CLS brought in Mario Wuysang who played with the Indonesia national basketball team as their point guard. Wuysang was reportedly the NBL player with the highest salary. Wuysang was paired with Dimaz. In 2015, the league reverted to its old name.

Jamarr Johnson, local dominance, and exit (2015–2017)
Five of them were brought CLS in the heyday by winning the IBL Indonesia for the first time. Jamarr came to Indonesia in 2014 and began playing in 2015. Not only that Sandy and Mario are Indonesian national team players in the event of the 2015 SEA Games, furthermore Thoyib return from retirement to make the CLS more intense. Febri which is a player in the Indonesian 2013 SEA Games also made great contributions. Johnson was recognized as the Most Valuable Player, Rookie of the Year, Top Scorer Awards in the IBL while Wuysang was recognized as the player with the Most Assists.

However, just after the 2017 IBL Indonesia season, the Knights pulled out of the league, citing a new rule change as one of the main reasons for their departure.

ASEAN Basketball League (2017–present)
After pulling out from the IBL, the Knights subsequently announced their entry to the ASEAN Basketball League, being one of the four new teams to enter the league in the 2017–18 season. The Knights was the first Indonesian team to join the league since the 2014 ABL season, when the Indonesia Warriors and Laskar Dreya South Sumatra last played in the pan-ASEAN league. The team played under the name "CLS Knights Indonesia" in the ABL. But during the mid season of ABL 2018-2019, on 11 January 2019 they announced their name change to "BTN CLS Kngihts" upon signing a sponsorship deal with BTN Bank. The Knights Finished the 2018-2019 ABL Season as the ABL Champion after defeating the Singapore Slingers in 5 games, Maxie Esho won the finals MVP after dropping 25 points in game 5.

ASEAN Basketball League Champions (2019)
CLS Knights won against Singapore Slingers with spectacular fashion in their home arena at OCBC Arena in Singapore, they took the championship after a 2–2 rally with Singapore Slingers. During the 2017–2018 season, the CLS Knights did not even make the playoffs, started off the season with 2–7. Eventually, CLS Knights finished off the season by winning 15 and losing 11, giving them the fourth seed in the playoffs. The first round took off on March 31, giving CLS Knights the 2–1 sweep. The Second round began, the hardest challenger CLS has faced off in the playoffs; CLS Knights took over the game with another 2–1 sweep. The Finals began, CLS Knights was not expecting any spectacular results knowing that Jerran Young will be playing in the final. The first game went on, CLS taking game 1 at OCBC Arena; eventually, they lost their next 2 games at OCBC Arena and GOR Kertajaya Surabaya. The second home game of CLS Knights is where they shined their powers again, taking the game 87–74. The final game is the most intense game so far in the playoffs, especially for a CLS Knights fan. CLS Knights were struggling during the first half, but they eventually found their rhythm and performed a spectacular comeback and taking the game. The CLS Knights was declared the champion of the ASEAN Basketball League champion for the 2018–2019 season. Soon after that, they announced that they won't be playing in the ABL 2019-2020 season

Players

Roster 2018–19

Depth chart

Individual awards 

ABL Finals MVP Award
 Maxie Esho – 2018–19

ABL Mid-Season Fan Award, Local MVP Award

 Wong Wei Long – 2018–19

ABL Mid-Season Fan Award, Best Defensive Player Award

 Doug Herring Jr. – 2018–19

Sonny Hendrawan MVP Award

 Jamarr Andre Johnson – 2016

Top Steal IBL/NBL

 Dimaz Muharri – 2010–11, 2012–13, 2013–14

Top Assist IBL/NBL

 Mario Wuysang – 2014–15, 2016, 2017
 Dimaz Muharri – 2013–14

Rookie of the Year

 Jamarr Andre Johnson – 2016

Top Score IBL/NBL

 Jamarr Andre Johnson – 2016

Coach of the Year

 Kim Dong-Won – 2013–14

Sixth-Man of the Year

 Rachmad Febri Utomo – 2011
 Arif Hidayat – 2017

Notable players

Season-by-season record

References

External links
Official site

ASEAN Basketball League teams
Basketball teams established in 1946
Basketball teams in Indonesia
Sport in Surabaya
Sport in East Java
1946 establishments in Indonesia